Franz Ocskay von Ocskö (1775–1851) was a Hungarian entomologist.
Freiherr Franz L. B. Ocskay was the son of Major-General Joseph Ocskay von Ocsko (1740–1805). He lived in Sopron (Ödenburg). Franz Ocskay described several new species of grasshoppers.

Works
1826 Gryllorum Hungariae indigenorum species aliquot. Acta Acad. Leopold. Carol. (Halle) 13(1): 407–410. 
1832 Orthoptera nova. Acta Acad. Leopold. Carol. (Halle) 16(2): 959–962. 
1844 Über den Standort seltener Insecten. Amtl. Bericht Naturf. Ges. Gräz 4: 181. 
1850 Toussaint von Charpentier's letzte Insektenabbildung. Acta Acad. Leopold. Carol. (Halle) 20(2): 6 Seiten. (with Johann Ludwig Christian Gravenhorst and Christian Gottfried Daniel Nees von Esenbeck).

References
Entry in Constantin von Wurzbach: Biographisches Lexikon des Kaiserthums Oesterreich, Bd. 20, Wien 1869, S. 475f. 
Walther Horn & Sigmund Schenkling: Index Litteraturae Entomologicae. Serie I: Die Welt-Literatur über die gesamte Entomologie bis inklusive 1863. Berlin 1928.

Hungarian entomologists
1775 births
1851 deaths